Vincent Ramaël (born 22 June 1988) is a French professional footballer who plays for UE Sant Julià in the Andorran Primera Divisió.

Career
Ramaël was born in Clamart, France. He began his career with Belgian side Excelsior Mouscron, where he signed his first professional contract on 31 August 2006. On 26 September 2006, he joined AS Monaco FC. He joined A.F.C. Tubize on loan on 18 July 2008. before returning to Monaco on 12 January 2009.

For the 2011–12 season he was signed by Belgian Third Division club Royal Geants Athois.

References

External links
 
 Footgoal Profile

Living people
1988 births
People from Clamart
Association football forwards
French footballers
A.F.C. Tubize players
Levadiakos F.C. players
SO Cassis Carnoux players
Club Sportivo San Lorenzo footballers
FC Lusitanos players
UE Sant Julià players
French expatriate footballers
Expatriate footballers in Belgium
French expatriate sportspeople in Belgium
Expatriate footballers in Greece
French expatriate sportspeople in Greece
Expatriate footballers in Paraguay
French expatriate sportspeople in Paraguay
Sint-Eloois-Winkel Sport players
Footballers from Hauts-de-Seine